Om Allah is a 2012 Indian Hindi-language film directed by Sameer Khan who was once associate director to Faisal Saif. The film stars Pakistani actress Meera and Indian sports promoter turned anchor Aushim Khetarpal. It is said that this film revolves around the real life match fixing incident of Aushim Khetarpal.

Synopsis
Ayesha Khan (Meera), A Pakistani Muslim journalist comes to India to work on a story of a Match Fixer Aushim Aushim Khetarpal who is now a Follower of Saibaba and is a Saint. Ayesha arrives in Mathura Vrindavan and is very uncomfortable with the Hindu Atmosphere. Somewhere inside, Ayesha is a little 'Fanatic'. How Ayesha is convinced to write the story of Aushim and follows his journey towards Spiritualism forms the whole film.

Cast
 Meera as Ayesha Khan
 Aushim Khetarpal as Aushim
 Milind Gunaji as Saibaba
 Kavita Radheshyam as Kusum Ganga
 Kiran Kumar
 Tej Sapru
 Nasser Abdullah
 Upasna Singh
 Reema Lagoo
 Shahbaaz Khan
 Vishnu Datt Tiwari

References

2012 films
2010s Hindi-language films
Films about Islam
Films about Hinduism